The 1980 Segunda División Peruana, the second division of Peruvian football (soccer), was played by 7 teams. The tournament winner, Unión Gonzales Prada was promoted to the 1980 Copa Perú.

Results

Standings

References
 Segunda division 1983
 2da division 1980

Peruvian Segunda División seasons
Peru2
2